The Waka–Kabic (Waka-Gabi) languages form an extinct family of Pama–Nyungan languages of Australia. The languages were:
Than: Gureng Gureng, Gabi (Kabikabi), Dappil (Tulua?)
Miyan: Wuliwuli, Waga (Wakawaka), Barunggam (Muringam)
Miyan may be a single language, Wakawaka. Gureng Gureng still has some L2 speakers.

The Kingkel languages, Darumbal and Bayali, are sometimes believed to be Waka-Kabic.  Bowern (2011) moved Darumbal to the Maric languages, but did not address Bayali.  The two languages are not close.

Footnotes

 
Kabi Kabi